Tomsky District  is an administrative and municipal district (raion), one of the sixteen in Tomsk Oblast, Russia. It is located in the southeast of the oblast. Its administrative center is the city of Tomsk (which is not administratively a part of the district). Population: 68,652 (2010 Census);

Administrative and municipal status
Within the framework of administrative divisions, Tomsky District is one of the sixteen in the oblast. The city of Tomsk serves as its administrative center, despite being incorporated separately as a city under oblast jurisdiction—an administrative unit with the status equal to that of the districts.

As a municipal division, the district is incorporated as Tomsky Municipal District. Tomsk City Under Oblast Jurisdiction is incorporated separately from the district as Tomsk Urban Okrug.

References

Notes

Sources

Districts of Tomsk Oblast
